Shay Revivo  (born December 13, 1986, Israel) is an Israeli footballer. He plays for Hapoel Ashdod.

He is the younger brother of Haim Revivo and David Revivo.

External links
 

1986 births
Living people
Israeli footballers
Association football midfielders
F.C. Ashdod players
Hapoel Tel Aviv F.C. players
Hapoel Haifa F.C. players
Maccabi Herzliya F.C. players
Hapoel Petah Tikva F.C. players
Hapoel Ashkelon F.C. players
Maccabi Sha'arayim F.C. players
Hapoel Ashdod F.C. players
Israeli Premier League players
Liga Leumit players
Israeli people of Moroccan-Jewish descent
Footballers from Ashdod